Chocolat Jacques is a Belgian firm which was founded in 1896 by Antoine Jacques in Verviers. Production was later moved to Bruges and Eupen.

The factory invented and launched an original chocolate bar, obtaining a patent for it in 1936. This chocolate bar is composed of six different pieces that can be broken off, and it is still the most well-known product of the brand. It is made of chocolate milk with one of seven tastes: mocha and rum, banana, three fruits, praline 100, crispy praline, biscuit 100, and nuts. The last piece is black chocolate filled with melting cappuccino biscuits.

In October 2018, the works' council announced the closure of the Eupen plant scheduled for May 2019. At the end of April 2019, the final closure is scheduled for May 17. However, the brand continues to be produced in Bruges.

Chromo pictures and albums
During much of the 20th century, the wrappers of "Jacques" chocolate bars contained collectible cards that could be stored in albums published by the factory. At first, they were just drawings, but afterwards there were even photos. The themes of the albums were various, for example about transport (trains or cars), the Belgian royal family, Belgian Congo, or Belgian geography.

There are still many collectors of these old Jacques cards and albums today.

Factory visits and museum
In October 1993 a museum was opened at the Eupen site, with video animations and old objects such as chocolate tins, packages and albums with their chromo pictures. Visitors could walk over the production space on a footbridge to see the pastry cooks working without bothering them. The Eupen site, and the museum, were closed down in January 2019.

References

External links
 http://www.chocojacques.be/

Belgian chocolate companies
Belgian brands
Companies based in Liège Province